Lion Blessé de Fotouni is a Cameroonian football club based in the city of Fotouni. They are a member of the Cameroonian Football Federation and currently play in the top domestic league Elite Two.

External links
Soccerway

Football clubs in Cameroon